Tyler State Park is a state park north of Tyler, Texas. The park includes a  lake. The land was deeded by private owners in 1934 and 1935; original improvements were made by the Civilian Conservation Corps (CCC). The park opened in 1939.

Activities include picnicking; camping; boating (motors allowed -  speed limit); boat rentals; fishing; birding; hiking; mountain biking; lake swimming (in unsupervised swimming area); and nature study.

Facilities

Restrooms with and without showers
Picnic sites (including 3 group picnic areas)
Campsites with water
Campsites with water and electricity (pull-through and back-in)
Campsites with water, electricity, and sewer (pull-through)
Screened shelters
A group camp with 6 cabins for overnight use and a dining hall with a full kitchen for day-use only; cabins and dining hall can be rented together or separately.

Trailer dump stations
A group dining hall
A  hiking trail
A  mountain bike trail
A  nature trail
An amphitheater on the lake shore
A seasonal grocery store that sells souvenirs and fishing supplies and rents canoes, paddle boats, kayaks, and fishing boats; a laundry tub; and a concrete launching ramp with a courtesy dock.

Flora/Fauna

Situated in the pineywoods, the steep dissected hillsides and the lake, with its associated vegetation, provides considerable habitat variety. Wildlife species are characteristic of east Texas: deer, squirrels, raccoons, opossums, as well as numerous species of birds. Popular fish include crappie, perch, catfish, and bass.

Directions

References
http://www.rvingtexas.com/tyler.htm

External links

 Film footage of Tyler State Park from Tyler, Texas – Where Life Is Enjoyable on the Texas Archive of the Moving Image

State parks of Texas
Protected areas of Smith County, Texas
Civilian Conservation Corps in Texas